Jane Elizabeth Shields (née Furniss, born 23 August 1960) is a female English former middle and long-distance runner.

Athletics career
At the IAAF World Cross Country Championships, she won a team gold medal in 1986, team silver in 1984 and team bronze in 1982, and had a best individual placing of fifth in 1984. She also finished seventh in the 3000 metres final at the 1983 World Championships, and represented Great Britain in the 3000 metres at the 1984 Los Angeles Olympics and in the 10,000 metres at the 1988 Seoul Olympics. She represented England in the 3,000 metres event, at the 1986 Commonwealth Games in Edinburgh, Scotland. Four years later she represented England in the 10,000 metres event, at the 1990 Commonwealth Games in Auckland, New Zealand.

International competitions

Personal bests
1500m – 4:11.51 (1983)
Mile – 4:30.29 (1983)
3000 m – 8:45.69 (1983)
5000 m – 15:32.34 (1988)
10,000 m – 32:42.0 (1988)

References

1960 births
Living people
Athletes (track and field) at the 1984 Summer Olympics
Athletes (track and field) at the 1988 Summer Olympics
British female long-distance runners
Olympic athletes of Great Britain
Place of birth missing (living people)
Athletes (track and field) at the 1986 Commonwealth Games
Athletes (track and field) at the 1990 Commonwealth Games
Commonwealth Games competitors for England